Chang Lake(), also known as Cang Lake, is a lake located in the town of Chang Lake, Shilin Yi Autonomous County, Yunnan, China.

References

Bibliography

Lakes of Yunnan
Shilin Yi Autonomous County
Geography of Kunming